This is a list of Armenian football transfers in the summer transfer window, by club. Only clubs of the 2022–23 Armenian Premier League are included.

Armenian Premier League 2022-23

Alashkert

In:

Out:

Ararat-Armenia

In:

Out:

Ararat Yerevan

In:

Out:

BKMA Yerevan

In:

Out:

Lernayin Artsakh

In:

Out:

Noah

In:

Out:

Pyunik

In:

Out:

Shirak

In:

Out:

Urartu

In:

Out:

Van

In:

Out:

References

Armenian
2022
2022–23 in Armenian football